The Peruvian Liga Femenina is the top-level league competition for women's football in Peru that officially started in 2021. The winner qualifies for the Copa Libertadores de Fútbol Femenino, the South American Champions League. The competition is organised by the Peruvian Football Federation.

History
The League is the successor to the Peruvian women's football championship that ran until the 2019 season, this being the only competition with semi-professional status in Peru.

The League began to be planned from the beginning of 2020, as a new system of competitions to replace the National Championship that had been organized until the previous year. However, the arrival of the COVID-19 pandemic to the country paralyzed all sporting activities indefinitely, thus postponing the implementation plans for the new tournament that season.

The League is scheduled to begin on May 29, 2021. It will be broadcast on television.

Teams

Because of the COVID-19 pandemic, the whole tournament is being played in a stadium:

List of champions

References

External links
 Peruvian Football Federation

Football competitions in Peru
Peru
Women's sports leagues in Peru